Kathy Howard (born June 21, 1958) is a retired American artistic gymnast. She won a team gold medal and a silver in floor at the 1975 Pan American Games. At the 1976 Summer Olympics she placed sixth with the team and shared 12th place in floor.

References

1958 births
Living people
Gymnasts at the 1976 Summer Olympics
Olympic gymnasts of the United States
American female artistic gymnasts
Pan American Games medalists in gymnastics
Pan American Games gold medalists for the United States
Pan American Games silver medalists for the United States
Gymnasts at the 1975 Pan American Games
Medalists at the 1975 Pan American Games
21st-century American women
20th-century American women